Daniel J. Arbess is a professional investor, social entrepreneur, policy analyst and lawyer who focuses on macroeconomic, geopolitical and major industrial developments. He founded investment firms Xerion Capital Partners and Xerion Investments and co-founded Stratton Investments, Taiga Capital Partners and Triton Partners.

Early life and education
Arbess was born on January 23, 1961, in Montreal, Quebec, Canada, and is a United States citizen. He received a JD from Osgoode Hall Law School in Toronto, and an LLM from the Harvard Law School. He was an affiliate at the John F. Kennedy School of Government and a fellow at the New York-based World Policy Institute.

Career
Arbess joined the international law firm White & Case in 1987, after having been in the Kremlin as a foreign observer when Mikhail Gorbachev unveiled the policies of Glasnost and Perestroika. He was the first American lawyer to re-locate to Eastern Europe, moving to Prague in early 1990. He advised the Czechoslovak (later Czech) government on its economic transition, principally involving privatization policy and transactions. In 1992, at 31, he became the youngest partner in the history of White & Case and Head of its Global Privatization Group. Arbess advised the Czechoslovak government on the restructuring of its auto industry, including the 1991 sale of Skoda Auto to Volkswagen AG for $6.4 billion (at the time, among the largest cross-border M & A transactions in European history), and the restructuring and sale of its downstream petrochemicals industry to a consortium of international oil majors. Arbess' privatization advisory work extended to Russia, Vietnam, Israel and other countries.

Arbess has been a principal investor since 1995, first pursuing restructuring-oriented private transactions in Europe. He is a co-founder of investment firms Taiga Capital, Stratton Investments and Triton Partners and founder, CEO and CIO of Xerion Investments., having launched Xerion Investments and Xerion Capital Partners in 2003 with the backing of S. Donald Sussman and his Paloma Partners. Arbess sold Xerion Capital Partners to Perella Weinberg Partners and became a partner of that firm in 2007. He was CIO of the $3.25 Billion Xerion Hedge Funds from 2003 to 2014. Xerion's noted investments captured the devolution of Communism and phases of China's economic reforms; the U.S. housing and financial crisis; monetary policy reflation of financial markets after the 2008 crisis;  and the restructuring of the U.S. airline and auto industries. He returned investor capital in late 2014 to pursue private interests and purposeful investment opportunities through Xerion Investments and its affiliates.

Boards
Arbess is a member of the Board of Directors of the Global Virus Network, the Corporate Advisory Board of Cancer Expert Now and the Finance Working Group of the Healthy Brains Global Initiative. He is a lifetime member of the Council on Foreign Relations, is a member of the Atlantic Council and advises the Vaclav Havel Library Foundation. He was a co-Founder of No Labels, a U.S. political organization promoting collaboration across the political spectrum.

Published works
 
 
 
 

 
 

 
 

 

|

|
|

Bibliography

References

External links

 

1961 births
American investors
Harvard Law School alumni
Living people
Osgoode Hall Law School alumni
People from Montreal